Jur P. van den Berg (born 1981 in Groningen, Netherlands) is the Chief Technology Officer and co-founder of driverless trucking startup Ike, which was sold to Nuro in 2020. He has been an assistant professor at the University of Utah. He was formerly a post-doctoral researcher in the Department of Industrial Engineering and Operations Research at the University of California, Berkeley and in the Department of Computer Science at the University of North Carolina at Chapel Hill.  He has published more than 40 works in computational chemistry, computational geometry, computer animation, industrial engineering, robotics, and virtual reality.  He has also coauthored the reciprocal velocity obstacle library for multi-agent navigation.

References

 Jur P. van den Berg bibliography in the DBLP database
 Jur P. van den Berg bibliography at the Microsoft Academic Search

1981 births
Dutch engineers
Living people
University of California, Berkeley staff
University of Groningen alumni
University of Utah faculty
Utrecht University alumni
People from Groningen (city)
Computational chemists
University of North Carolina at Chapel Hill staff